Old Sarum Castle, formerly known as Seresberi Castle, is an 11th century motte-and-bailey castle built in Old Sarum, Wiltshire. It was originally built in timber and it was eventually built in stone, of which the ruins can be seen today. Only the mound and foundations of the castle survive today. The castle is owned by the English Heritage and it is open to the public, along with the rest of Old Sarum.

History
In 1069, after recognising the defensive qualities of Seresberi, now known as Old Sarum, William the Conqueror built a motte-and-bailey castle within an older Iron Age hillfort known as Sorviodunum, constructed around 400 BC. The courtyard was added around 1100 by Bishop Roger and he also began work on a royal palace during the 1130s, prior to his arrest by Henry's successor Stephen. and directed the royal administration and exchequer along with his extended family. This palace was long thought to have been the small structure whose ruins are located in the small central bailey; it may, however, have been the large palace recently discovered  in the southeast quadrant of the outer bailey. A  room was probably a great hall and there seems to have been a large tower.

In 1171, King Henry II ordered that improvements are made to Old Sarum (which last until 1189), including a new gatehouse, drawbridge, inner bailey walls and a treasury constructed within the keep of the castle. In addition to this work refurbishment of the quarters for Queen Eleanor of Aquitaine are completed for the period of her house arrest at Old Sarum, which would last also until 1189. Following continued repairs and maintenance, a new hall, kitchen and bakehouse are built for the sheriff starting from 1201 and ending before 1215. After most of the population of Old Sarum had relocated to Salisbury by 1220, the castle became unused and was in ruins by 1240 but it was eventually repaired, only to be demolished by King Edward III in 1322.

Edward III eventually ordered £700 to be spent on repairs and maintenance of the castle within Old Sarum around 1350, but the additional £600 required to repair the keep was never spent and the state of the castle started to deteriorate over time.

The site of the castle and cathedral ruins at Old Sarum are considered a highly important British monument: it was among the 26 English locations scheduled by the 1882 Ancient Monuments Protection Act, the first such British legislation. That protection has subsequently continued, expanding to include some suburban areas west and south-east of the outer bailey. It was also listed as a Grade I site in 1972. Old Sarum Castle, along with the cathedral ruins, is now administered by English Heritage. Its paved carpark and grass overflow carpark are located in the eastern area of the outer bailey.

References 

Buildings and structures completed in the 11th century
Castles in Wiltshire
Motte-and-bailey castles
Grade I listed castles